Karkareh or Karkarreh or Kerkereh may refer to:
 Karkareh, Kermanshah
 Kerkereh, West Azerbaijan